The Bannan or Blue line (code BL) is a metro line of Taipei Metro in Taipei, Taiwan, with a total of 23 stations serving the districts of Nangang, Xinyi, Daan, Zhongshan, Wanhua, Banqiao and Tucheng. The line's name is a portmanteau of Banqiao and Nangang.

The entire line runs underground.  The excavation of tunnels using the cut-and-cover method resulted in large scale detouring of road traffic. Because of that, the line runs beneath existing roads and totals .

Overview 

Due to  being at the centre of the Taipei 101 New Year's festivities, intervals between trains can be reduced to a minimum of 135 seconds, transporting up to 39,000 passengers per hour. This results in an average of about 27 trains per hour on the line during peak hours.

History 

 8 November 1990: The Nangang section begins construction.
 30 December 1991: The Taipei Main Station western underground passageway opens.
 24 December 1993: Nangang section construction at the intersection of Zhongxiao East Rd and Shaoxing Rd caves in, causes traffic jams.
 30 October 1998: Construction is completed on the tunnel between Kunyang and Houshanpi.
 17 September 2001: Typhoon Nari floods many stations, rendering them nonoperational.
 29 November 2001: Taipei Main Station re-opens for service.
 30 December 2003: The Nangang section eastern extension to  begins construction.
 17 November 2004: The Nangang section eastern extension to  begins construction.
 21 May 2014: The 2014 Taipei Metro attack occurs between Longshan Temple and  when 21-year-old university student Cheng Chieh attacked passengers with a fruit knife, leading to 4 deaths and 24 injuries.
 28 September 2018: Half-height platform edge doors are installed in Tucheng, making all stations on this line and entire Taipei Metro system have some form of platform doors.

Stations

Services 
As of December 2017, the typical off-peak service is:

Stations

References 

1999 establishments in Taiwan
Railway lines opened in 1999
Taipei Metro